Asia Euro United is a football club in Kandal, Cambodia. It plays in the Cambodian League, the top division of Cambodian football and it represents Asia Euro University.

Current squad

Honours
TV5 Pre season championship

Winner: 1 (2020)

References

External links
 Soccerway
 

Football clubs in Cambodia
University and college association football clubs